The Queens Park Arts Centre is an independent arts centre and theatre in Aylesbury, Buckinghamshire, England.

Programme
The Centre offers more than 70 drop-in, pay-as-you-go workshops on a weekly basis, covering artistic disciplines such as pottery, painting & drawing, drama, dance, music, woodwork, textiles and jewellery making. Additional classes run during the school holidays, whilst other one-off workshops explore more specialised subjects such as blacksmithing.

Queens Park is also the home of the Limelight Theatre, a 120-seater venue which offers live music, theatre and comedy on Friday and Saturday nights. Acts who have performed at the theatre include Eddie Izzard, Jo Brand, John Otway, Wild Willy Barrett and Chris Ramsey.

Additional facilities at the Centre include multiple exhibition spaces, a Coffee Shop, licensed bar, and a shop selling art supplies and resources.

The Centre regularly holds events for the local community, including Art & Craft Fairs and Maker's Fairs.

Ongoing projects at the Centre include the WanderHouse Outreach Project - which has enabled artistic collaborations with various schools in Aylesbury, and Unbound - the Centre's in-house theatre company whilst stages multiple productions each year, including a pantomime.

Sarah Lewis is the Artistic Director at the centre. The centre's Marketing Coordinator / Limelight Theatre Manager is Dario Knight. Carlotta Tonello is currently the Arts Centre Administrator.

History
Queens Park Arts Centre is based in a former Edwardian primary school and receives no funding from local government. It is the largest independent arts centre in the United Kingdom. It was established in 1980 and was first directed by Malcolm Thackwray through funding by Buckinghamshire County Council. In 1998, the Centre became an independent company when its government funding was withdrawn. £325,000 was raised to purchase the freehold to the site, which was secured in 2009. Since then in excess of £200,000 has been raised to refurbish and restore the building.

References

External links
 

Arts centres in England
Aylesbury
Theatres in Buckinghamshire
1980 establishments in England